The Switzerland national handball team is the national handball team of Switzerland.

Competitive record

Olympic Games

World Championship

World Outdoor Championship

Switzerland is the only country which played at every Field Handball World Championship.

European Championship

Team

Current squad
Squad for the 2021 World Men's Handball Championship.

Head coach: Michael Suter

Player statistics

References

External links

IHF profile

Men's national handball teams
Handball in Switzerland
H